Sofie Karoline Haugen (born 22 April 1995) is a Norwegian speed skater. She won a bronze medal in team sprint at the 2018 European Speed Skating Championships in Kolomna, Russia, along with Martine Ripsrud and Anne Gulbrandsen. Haugen participated in the World Allround Speed Skating Championships in 2016, 2017 and 2018.

References

External links 
 
 

1995 births
Living people
People from Sandefjord
Norwegian female speed skaters
Speed skaters at the 2022 Winter Olympics
Olympic speed skaters of Norway
Sportspeople from Vestfold og Telemark
21st-century Norwegian women